is a Japanese politician and the current governor of Saga Prefecture located in Kyushu region of Japan.

On August 12, 2019. the special Natsu no Saga, a documentary on the Zombie Land Saga anime (which takes place in the prefecture), featured  Yamaguchi cosplaying as major character Kotaro Tatsumi.

References 

1965 births
Living people
People from Saga Prefecture
People from Iruma, Saitama
Politicians from Saitama Prefecture
University of Tokyo alumni